Sivert Solli (born 28 July 1997) is a Norwegian footballer who plays in midfield for Ranheim.

Career
Sivert Solli made his debut for Rosenborg coming on for the second half in a 3-0 win in a cup game against Vuku. A few months later, after impressing during training with the first team Sivert Solli was awarded with a first team contract on July 8, 2015.

In November 2015 Solli, alongside teammates Andreas Helmersen and John Hou Sæter, became the first players in Norwegian football history to having won the Under-16, Under-19 and the senior Norwegian Football Cup. Solli won the Under-16 Cup in 2013 and then the Under-19 and the senior cup in 2015.

Solli made his league debut for Rosenborg against Vålerenga 2 October 2016, coming on for Guðmundur Þórarinsson after 84 minutes in a game Rosenborg won 3-1.

In January 2017, Solli was sent out on loan to Elverum in the Norwegian First Division. Solli was loaned out to IL Stjørdals-Blink for the 2019 season.

On 19 December 2017, Solli signed for Ranheim

Career statistics

Honours

Club
 Rosenborg
Norwegian Football Cup (2): 2015, 2016
Norwegian U-19 Championship (1): 2015
Norwegian U-16 Championship (1): 2013

References

External links
 Profile at RBK.no

1997 births
Living people
Norwegian footballers
Rosenborg BK players
Elverum Fotball players
Ranheim Fotball players
IL Stjørdals-Blink players
Eliteserien players
Norwegian First Division players
Norwegian Second Division players
Association football midfielders